Ivan Lazarov (born 27 December 1929) is a Bulgarian former sports shooter. He competed in the 50 metre rifle, three positions event at the 1960 Summer Olympics.

References

External links
 

1929 births
Possibly living people
Bulgarian male sport shooters
Olympic shooters of Bulgaria
Shooters at the 1960 Summer Olympics
Sportspeople from Sofia
20th-century Bulgarian people